Danny Joe Brown and the Danny Joe Brown Band is the first and only studio album by American southern rock band The Danny Joe Brown Band, released in 1981.

Track listing

Personnel

Band members
Danny Joe Brown - lead vocals
Bobby Ingram - guitar, slide guitar, backing vocals
Kenny McVay - guitar
Steve Wheeler - guitar, slide guitar
John Galvin - keyboards, backing vocals
Buzzy Meekins - bass, backing vocals
Jimmy Glenn - drums

Production
Glyn Johns - producer, engineer
Sean Fullen - assistant engineer
George Marino - mastering at Sterling Sound, New York

Charts

References

1981 debut albums
Epic Records albums
Albums produced by Glyn Johns
The Danny Joe Brown Band albums